The 1991 PGA Tour season was played from January 3 to November 3. The season consisted of 44 official money events. Billy Andrade, Mark Brooks, Fred Couples, Andrew Magee, Corey Pavin, Nick Price, Tom Purtzer, and Ian Woosnam won the most tournaments, two, and there were 14 first-time winners. The tournament results, leaders, and award winners are listed below.

Schedule
The following table lists official events during the 1991 season.

Unofficial events
The following events were sanctioned by the PGA Tour, but did not carry official money, nor were wins official.

Money leaders
The money list was based on prize money won during the season, calculated in U.S. dollars.

Awards

Notes

References

External links
PGA Tour official site

PGA Tour seasons
PGA Tour